Suryakantha is a Sanskrit film made in Kerala, India. It is the fifth  Sanskrit film overall and the  first  contemporary Sanskrit film, which narrates the story of an ageing couple living out their last days. It talks about common people who converse in Sanskrit.
The film won 'Special Jury award' in Kerala Film Critics Associations awards, 2017.

Plot
Suryakantha tells the story of an ageing couple living out their last 
days. The couple, both Kathakali artists, live a dreary life and their 
only comfort is the lovely memories of a glorious past where they had 
amazed the audiences with outstanding performances. Janaki (Simi Baiju), who was a
dancer in her prime, is now bed-ridden and Narayanan, (Rajesh Hebbar) her husband, who was once a famous Kathakali singer,
is making a living as a carpenter. His only aim in life is to 
keep his ailing wife comfortable and happy.

References

2017 films
Sanskrit-language films
Indian dance films